Events in the year 1724 in Norway.

Incumbents
Monarch: Frederick IV

Events

Arts and literature
 Mo Church was built.

Births
22 January - Ole Irgens, bishop (died 1803)

Deaths